FC Torpedo Miass is a Russian football team from Miass. It played professionally from 1964 to 1970, from 1988 to 2001 and from 2021. It reached the second-highest level, Russian First Division in 1992 and 1993. From 1995 to 2001 it was called UralAZ Miass after the UralAZ company located in the city. Since 2007 the club played in the Amateur Football League. For the 2021–22 season, it was licensed once again for the Russian third-tier.

Current squad
As of 22 February 2023, according to the Second League website.

References

External links
  Team history at KLISF

Association football clubs established in 1942
Football clubs in Russia
Sport in Chelyabinsk Oblast
1942 establishments in Russia